Harry Alphonso Ebun Sawyerr (9 October 1909 – August 1986) was a Sierra Leonean Anglican theologian and writer on African religion. He became principal of Fourah Bay College and Vice Chancellor of the University of Sierra Leone.

Sawyerr studied initially at Fourah Bay College, later moving to England to study at the main campus of Durham University. He successively earned Bachelor of Arts (1933), Master of Arts (1936) and Master of Education (1940) degrees.

Harry Sawyerr was influenced by Thomas Sylvester Johnson, the first assistant bishop of Sierra Leone.

Works
 (with William Thomas Harris) The Springs of Mende Beliefs and Conduct:  a discussion of the influence of the belief in the supernatural among the Mende, 1968
 Creative Evangelism: towards a new Christian encounter with Africa, 1968
 God: Ancestor or Creator? Aspects of traditional belief in Ghana, Nigeria & Sierra Leone, 1970
 (ed. J. Paratt)  The Practice of Presence: Selected Papers of Harry Sawyerr, 1995

References

1909 births
1986 deaths
Anglican theologians
Sierra Leonean Anglicans
Sierra Leone Creole people
Alumni of St John's College, Durham
Academic staff of Fourah Bay College